The year 2002 in birding and ornithology.

Worldwide

New species

See also Bird species new to science described in the 2000s

Taxonomic developments

Ornithologists

Deaths
 12 January - René de Naurois
 22 September - Tommy Garnett
 2 October - George A. Bartholomew
 10 October - Mike Rogers
 18 October - Ronald Hickling
 23 November - Paul Géroudet
 8 December - John Kenneth Terres
? - Tatsuo Utagawa

World listing

Europe

Britain

Breeding birds

Migrant and wintering birds

Rare birds
 A large influx of cattle egrets occurs in January, including a flock of eight in Sussex
 Britain's first long-billed murrelet is found in Devon in November

Other events

Ireland

Rare birds
Ireland's first cirl bunting is found in Co. Cork
Ireland's first Canada warbler is found in Co. Clare
Ireland's second Baltimore oriole, second isabelline shrike and second hermit thrush are all found in Co. Cork

Scandinavia
To be completed

North America
To be completed

References

Birding and ornithology
Bird
Birding and ornithology by year